Frederick IV, Duke of Saxe-Gotha-Altenburg (Gotha, 28 November 1774 – Gotha, 11 February 1825), was the last duke of Saxe-Gotha-Altenburg.

He was the third but second surviving son of Ernst II, Duke of Saxe-Gotha-Altenburg and Charlotte de Saxe-Meiningen.

After the death of his older brother August without sons (1822), Frederick (the only surviving male of the house) inherited the duchy of Saxe-Gotha-Altenburg.

Frederick fought - after military training - in the Napoleonic campaigns and was heavily wounded. As a consequence of these injuries, he was constantly ill until his death. Because of his illness, he traveled for a long time seeking a cure.  During these stays outside of his duchy, he left the government in hands of his secret advisor Bernhard August von Lindenau.

He only reigned three years and died unmarried; with him, the line of Saxe-Gotha-Altenburg ended. After his death, his lands were repartitioned among his Wettin relations. Ernst I of Saxe-Coburg-Saalfeld received Gotha, and changed his title to Duke of Saxe-Coburg and Gotha, although the two duchies remained technically separate in a personal union.  Altenburg was thereafter ruled by the Duke of Saxe-Hildburghausen, whose dukedom was transferred to Saxe-Meiningen along with Saxe-Saalfeld, which Saxe-Coburg gave up in return for receiving Saxe-Gotha.

Ancestors

References 
 August Beck: Friedrich IV., Herzog von Sachsen-Gotha und Altenburg. In: Allgemeine Deutsche Biographie (ADB). Band 8, Duncker & Humblot, Leipzig 1878, S. 6 f.

1774 births
1825 deaths
House of Saxe-Gotha-Altenburg
People from Saxe-Gotha-Altenburg
People from Gotha (town)
Dukes of Saxe-Gotha-Altenburg
German military personnel of the Napoleonic Wars